Goodenia decurrens is a species of flowering plant in the family Goodeniaceae and is endemic to New South Wales. It is an erect, glabrous undershrub with lance-shaped to elliptic, toothed leaves, yellow flowers arranged in racemes or thyrses, and oval fruit.

Description

Taxonomy and naming
Goodenia decurrens was first formally described in 1810 by Robert Brown in Prodromus Florae Novae Hollandiae et Insulae Van Diemen. The specific epithet (decurrens) refers to the decurrent leaves.

Distribution and habitat
This goodenia grows on sandstone cliffs in forest between Blackheath and Wollar in New South Wales.

References

 decurrens
Flora of New South Wales
Plants described in 1810
Taxa named by Robert Brown (botanist, born 1773)